Chora Chittha Chora is a 1999 Indian Kannada language romance drama film directed by Subramanya and produced by Sa. Ra. Govindu. The film stars  V. Ravichandran, Namrata Shirodkar and Malavika. This was Shirodkar's first & only  Kannada film.

The film was a remake of Telugu film Allari Priyudu (1993) directed by K. Raghavendra Rao. The music was composed by Ravichandran to the lyrics of K. Kalyan.

The movie was later dubbed in Hindi as Chura Liya Hai Tumne Jo Dil Ko.

plot
A man falls in love with a woman after their friendship blossoms through letters. However, he is unaware that her adoptive sister is the one writing them.

Cast 

 V. Ravichandran 
 Namrata Shirodkar
 Malavika 
 Srinivasa Murthy
 Umashri
 Kashi
 Balaraj
 Sumithra
 Tennis Krishna
 Mandya Ramesh
 Bank Janardhan
 Shivaram
 Sarigama Viji
 Mimicry Dayanand

Soundtrack 
The music was composed by V. Ravichandran and lyrics were written by K. Kalyan and Shree Chandru. A total of 8 tracks have been composed for the film and the audio rights brought by Jhankar Music.

References

External links 

 
 Movie preview at Online Bangalore

1999 films
1990s Kannada-language films
Indian romantic drama films
Kannada remakes of Telugu films
Films scored by V. Ravichandran